Joe Bones the Human Fly was a World War II comic strip published in the British post-war boys' weekly The Victor. The artists of this strip have remained anonymous.

Concept

Joe Bones was a young soldier in the British Army during the Second World War. He was a talented climber, and was sent on commando missions by Government agent Lord Plimpton (referred to by Joe as "The Guv") that involved climbing 'unclimbable' obstacles – hence his nickname, the Human Fly.

Sources

British comic strips
Bones, Joe
Bones, Joe
Bones, Joe
Comics set during World War II
DC Thomson Comics strips
Comic strips missing date information